Washington v. United States, 584 U.S. ___ (2018), was a United States Supreme Court case regarding Native American fishing rights in the U.S. state of Washington. In the case, the court deadlocked 4-4, with Justice Anthony Kennedy recusing himself due to his prior involvement in the case as a judge on the United States Ninth Circuit Court of Appeals. The deadlock left standing a lower court ruling that the State of Washington must redesign and rebuild road culverts to allow salmon to swim upstream, to uphold Native American treaty rights to fish. The issue decided by the federal courts was whether, under the 1855–1856 Stevens Treaties, "the right to fish is the right to put a net in the water or the right for there to be fish to catch"; however, with the 4-4 Supreme Court decision, it may not be binding on future court decisions.

The case was argued on April 18, 2018.

The decision was per curiam.

The state was given until 2030 to repair the highest-priority culverts.

See also
United States v. Washington, aka Boldt Decision, landmark 1974 ruling establishing treaty fishing rights in Washington
Puget Sound salmon
Stream restoration

References

External links
 

United States Supreme Court cases
United States Supreme Court cases of the Roberts Court
Legal history of Washington (state)
United States Native American treaty case law
2018 in United States case law
2018 in Washington (state)
Native American history of Washington (state)
Tie votes of the United States Supreme Court
Fisheries law